The Genius After Hours is an album by American musician Ray Charles, released in 1961. The songs featured on the album were taken from the same three studio sessions that created his 1957 album The Great Ray Charles, which featured the use of both a trio and a septet; the latter was arranged by Quincy Jones. Also appearing on The Genius After Hours is David "Fathead" Newman on tenor and alto saxophone, alongside trumpeter Joseph Bridgewater.

The Genius After Hours consists entirely of instrumental tracks. It was reissued in 1985 by Atlantic Jazzlore.

Critical reception

In a 2003 review for AllMusic, jazz critic Scott Yanow summarized the album as "Fine music; definitely a change of pace for Ray Charles."

Track listing

Personnel
 Ray Charles – piano
 David "Fathead" Newman – alto saxophone, tenor saxophone
 Emmett Dennis – baritone saxophone
 Joseph Bridgewater & John Hunt – trumpet
 Oscar Pettiford or Roosevelt Sheffield – double bass
 William Peeples – drums

References

External links 
 

1961 albums
Ray Charles albums
Atlantic Records albums
Albums produced by Quincy Jones
Albums produced by Nesuhi Ertegun
Rhino Records albums